My Father Is an Idealist is a 1980 Soviet romance film directed by Vladimir Bortko.

Plot 
The film is about a resuscitator who cannot get along with his father, but everything changes when a young stepmother is in danger during childbirth.

Cast 
 Vladislav Strzhelchik		
 Yuriy Bogatyryov	
 Natalya Varley
 Irina Skobtseva
 Ivan Dmitriev
 Igor Dmitriev
 Aleksandr Belinsky
 Vladimir Retsepter
 Boris Sokolov
 Vsevolod Gavrilov

References

External links 
 

1980 films
1980s Russian-language films
Soviet romance films
Films directed by Vladimir Bortko